Kenneth Høie (born 11 September 1979) is a Norwegian former professional football goalkeeper. In 1998–99 he had a trial at Manchester United, featuring in one Reserve game, a 0–1 defeat to Liverpool on 22 April.

External links
IK Start

1979 births
Living people
People from Haugesund
Norwegian footballers
Norway international footballers
Norway under-21 international footballers
Norway youth international footballers
FK Haugesund players
Bryne FK players
IK Start players
Sogndal Fotball players
Pors Grenland players
FK Bodø/Glimt players
IF Elfsborg players
Djurgårdens IF Fotboll players
Allsvenskan players
Norwegian expatriate footballers
Expatriate footballers in Sweden
Norwegian expatriate sportspeople in Sweden
Association football goalkeepers
Sportspeople from Rogaland